What You Won't Do for Love may refer to:

 "What You Won't Do for Love" (Bobby Caldwell song)
 Bobby Caldwell (album), 1978 album by Bobby Caldwell, a.k.a. What You Won't Do for Love
 What You Won't Do for Love (novel), a 2005 novel by Wendy Coakley-Thompson